The , complete title  popularly known as  is a 52 volume synthesis of Zoology published between 1948 and 1979 originally under the direction of Pierre-Paul Grassé. A new edition commenced in 1980. The books were not published in order, and some promised parts are yet to appear. The books are written in the French language.

Tomes

 Tome I, Fascicule 1 (1952) : Phylogénie. Protozoaires : généralités. Flagellés.
 Tome I, Fascicule 2 (1953) : Rhizopodes, Sporozoaires, Cnidosporidies.
 Tome II, Fascicule 1 (1984) : Infusoires ciliés. Tome co-dirigé avec Pierre de Puytorac.
 Tome II, Fascicule 2 (1994) : Infusoires ciliés.
 Tome III, Fascicule 1 (1994) : Spongiaires, anatomie, physiologie systématique.
 Tome III, Fascicule 2 (1997) : Cnidaires (Hydrozoaires, Scyphozoaires et Cubozoaires), Cténaires. Tome co-dirigé avec André Franc.
 Tome III, Fascicule 3 (1953, 1997) : Cnidaires anthozoaires. Tome co-dirigé avec Dominique Doumenc.
 Tome IV, Fascicule 1 (1961, 1997) : Plathelminthes, Mésozoaires, Acanthocéphales, Némertiens.
 Tome IV, Fascicule 2 (1965) : Némathelminthes (Nématodes).
 Tome IV, Fascicule 3 (1965) : Némathelminthes (Nématodes, Gordiacés), Rotifères, Gastrotriches, Kinorhynques.
 Tome V, Fascicule 1 (1959, 2007) : Annélides, Myzostomides, Sipunculiens, Echiuriens, Priapuliens, Endoproctes, Phoronidiens.
 Tome V, Fascicule 2 (1959, 2007) : Bryozoaires, Brachiopodes, Chétognathes, Pogonophores, Mollusques (généralités, Aplacophores, Polyplacophores, Monoplacophores, Bivalves).
 Tome V, Fascicule 3 (1959, 1997) : Mollusques, Gastéropodes et Scaphopodes.
 Tome V, Fascicule 4 (1997) : Céphalopodes. Tome co-dirigé avec Katarina Mangold.
 Tome VI (1949) : Onychophores, Tardigrades, Arthropodes, Trilobitomorphes, Chélicérates.
 Tome VII, Fascicule 2 (1996) : Crustacés.
 Tome VIII, Fascicule 1 (1973) : Insectes. Tête, Aile.
 Tome VIII, Fascicule 2 (1979) : Insectes. Thorax, Abdomen.
 Tome VIII, Fascicule 3 (1975) : Insectes. Téguments, système nerveux, organes sensoriels.
 Tome VIII, Fascicule 4 (1976) : Insectes. Splanchnologie, vie aquatique, rapports avec les Plantes.
 Tome VIII, Fascicule 5-A (1977) : Insectes. Gamétogenèses, fécondation, métamorphoses.
 Tome VIII, Fascicule 5-B (1977) : Insectes. Embryologie, Cécidogenèse, Insectes venimeux.
 Tome IX (1949) : Insectes : paléontologie, géonémie, Aptérygotes, Ephéméroptères, Odonatoptères, Blattoptéroïdes, Orthoptéroïdes, Dermaptéroïdes, Coléoptères.
 Tome X, Fascicule 1 (1951) : Nevropteroides, Mecopteroides, Hymenopteroides (Symphytes, Apocrites Terebranta).
 Tome X, Fascicule 2 (1951) : Hymenopteroides (Apocrites Aculeata), Psocopteroides, Hemipteroides, Thysanopteroides.
 Tome XI (1948, 2007) : Echinodermes, Stomocordés, Procordés.
 Tome XII (1954) : Vertébrés : embryologie, grands problèmes d'anatomie comparée, caractéristiques biochimiques.
 Tome XIII, Fascicule 1 (1958) : Agnathes et poissons. Anatomie, éthologie, systématique.
 Tome XIII, Fascicule 2 (1958, 1997) : Agnathes et poissons. Anatomie, éthologie, systématique.
 Tome XIII, Fascicule 3 (1958) : Agnathes et poissons. Anatomie, éthologie, systématique.
 Tome XIV, Fascicule 1a (1997) : Amphibiens. Tome co-dirigé avec Michel Delsol.
 Tome XIV, Fascicule 1b (1997) : Amphibiens et reptiles.
 Tome XIV, Fascicule 2 (1970) : Reptiles. Caractères généraux et anatomie.
 Tome XIV, Fascicule 3 (1970) : Reptiles. Glandes endocrines, embryologie, systématique, paléontologie.
 Tome XV (1950) : Oiseaux.
 Tome XVI, Fascicule 1 (1967, 1997) : Mammifères. Téguments et squelettes.
 Tome XVI, Fascicule 2 (1968, 2007) : Mammifères. Musculature.
 Tome XVI, Fascicule 3 (1971, 1997) : Mammifères. Musculature des membres, musculature peaucière, musculature des monotrèmes. Arthrologie.
 Tome XVI, Fascicule 4 (1972) : Mammifères. Systèm nerveaux, Organes des sens, Apareil circulatore, Sang et Lymphe.
 Tome XVI, Fascicule 5 (1973, 1997) : Mammifères. Splanchnologie. (in 2 books)
 Tome XVI, Fascicule 6 (1969, 2007) : Mammifères. Mamelles, appareil génital, gamétogenèse, fécondation, gestation.
 Tome XVI, Fascicule 7 (1982, 1997) : Mammifères. Embryologie, anatomie systématique et biologie.
 Tome XVII, Fascicule 1 (1955, 1997) : Mammifères. Les ordres : anatomie, éthologie, systématique.
 Tome XVII, Fascicule 2 (1955) : Mammifères. Les ordres : anatomie, éthologie, systémat

External links
 
 Tables of contents at SWB Online-Katalog

Zoological literature
Entomological literature